Zibiška Vas is a small village in the Municipality of Šmarje pri Jelšah in eastern Slovenia. It lies on Zibika Creek west of Pristava pri Mestinju. The area is part of the traditional region of Styria. The municipality is now included in the Savinja Statistical Region.

References

External links
Zibiška Vas at Geopedia

Populated places in the Municipality of Šmarje pri Jelšah